Kenny "Kenji" Gallo (born 1968) is a Japanese-Italian American gangster-turned-informant, a former director and producer of adult films, and an author.

A convicted narcotics dealer on the West Coast associated with the Los Angeles crime family and New York City's Colombo crime family, Gallo became an informant against such mafioso as alleged Colombo crime family heir apparent Theodore "Teddy" Persico Jr. His memoir Breakshot: A Life in the 21st Century American Mafia, co-authored with Matthew Randazzo V, was published in August 2009 by Phoenix Books, and the co-owner of the Breakshot Blog.

Criminal career and life as an informant
Following the death of convicted hitman Charles Harrelson, Gallo was interviewed and identified in the Sunday 2007 issue of The Sunday Times as a "convicted Mafia associate" and friend of Harrelson.

Film career
An adult film and B-movie director and producer from the late 1980s to the early 2000s, he directed twenty-nine adult films. While a filmmaker, Gallo met and married adult entertainment star Tabitha Stevens; their short-lived marriage included a Jerry Springer Show episode titled "I'm Married to a Porn Star!". They divorced in 1997.

Gallo also appears on the Discovery Channel show Flipped: A Mobster Tells All and Spike TV's Deadliest Warrior, where he served as an expert for the Medellin Cartel in "Somali Pirates vs. Medellin Cartel".

Bibliography
 Breakshot: A Life in the 21st Century American Mafia with Matthew Randazzo V (Phoenix Books 2009)

References

External links
 Kenny Gallo's Breakshot Blog Homepage at Blogger
 Kenny Gallo's Hollywood Mafia Homepage
 Kenny Gallo's Hollywood Mafia Blog
 
 
 Kenji's directing credits at the AFDB

1968 births
Colombo crime family
Los Angeles crime family
American gangsters of Italian descent
American gangsters
Living people
Organized crime memoirists
American people of Japanese descent